John Thomas Riedl (January 16, 1962 – July 15, 2013) was an American computer scientist and the McKnight Distinguished Professor at the University of Minnesota. His published works include highly influential research on the social web, recommendation systems, and collaborative systems.

Life and work
John Riedl received his B.S. in Mathematics from the University of Notre Dame in 1983 and his M.S. in Computer Science from Purdue University in 1985. He completed his Ph.D. in Computer Science at Purdue University in 1990. He became an assistant professor at the University of Minnesota in 1990 and was promoted to associate professor in 1996 and again to professor in 2003.

At the university, he led the GroupLens Research group. In 2012 he was awarded the McKnight Distinguished Professor position. During his time as a professor he advised 16 Ph.D. students who went on to take faculty positions and work at technology companies like Google, PARC, Intel, eBay, and the Wikimedia Foundation. He was also the faculty advisor for a long-running project in which twelve undergraduates each year would hone their entrepreneurial and software-development skills by taking charge of the development and maintenance of Chipmark, an online bookmark-sharing service.

He was a founder of the field of recommender systems, social computing, and interactive intelligent user interface systems. In 1996, he co-founded Net Perceptions to commercialize recommender systems research, which had "an enormous impact on e-commerce and information portals." At the height of the dot-com bubble, Net Perceptions was valued at $1.5 billion and had over 300 employees, but the company was liquidated in 2004.

Riedl died on July 15, 2013, after a 3-year-long battle with melanoma.

Honors and awards
Riedl was honored with the ACM Software System Award in 2010 for his work on recommender systems. He was named an ACM Fellow in 2009 and was also named an IEEE Fellow in 2012. He received numerous awards for his conference publications including best papers at CSCW, IUI, and WikiSym. He has also received commendations for his teaching, including the Outstanding Teacher Award at the University of Minnesota four times (1990–1993, 2010–2011) and the George Taylor Award for Exceptional Contributions to Teaching (1995–96).

Publications

Highly cited articles

References

Further reading
  – profile of collaborative filtering, recommendations, and Net Perceptions' recommender system
 2013 Profile of Riedl's work, from UMN research
 John T Riedl Memorial Fund.  This fund supports undergraduate and graduate students through an annual teaching award and other scholarship and fellowship funding.  You can give money to the fund on the website.

External links

 
 Personal Blog
 In memoriam: John Riedl

1962 births
2013 deaths
University of Notre Dame alumni
Purdue University alumni
University of Minnesota faculty
American computer scientists
Human–computer interaction researchers
Fellows of the Association for Computing Machinery
Deaths from melanoma